Nemesis is an original novel based on the U.S. television series Angel. Tagline: "Evil lurks where the science and supernatural collide." (The promotional picture of the book cover in this article has the wrong tagline.)

Plot summary
One of Fred's old friends from graduate school contacts her for help at a big scientific facility. Fred has conflicted feelings about her past, and the life she might be able to lead independent of demons. However on the night they are supposed to meet, her friend is shot down, a seemingly innocent victim of a misdirected hit.

Angel and the others wish they could help Fred, but are needed to investigate a series of murders among a group of wizards. The wizards are the only ones standing against an apocalyptic breach; they are literally holding the walls of reality together from more-deadly worlds. Fred leaves the investigation and takes the place of her friend as researcher to try to uncover her murder. Soon the supernatural and the scientific research collide, and Fred realizes she might be the only one who can stop the coming end-time.

Continuity
Supposed to be set in the last half of Angel season 4.

Canonical issues

Angel books such as this one are not usually considered by fans as canonical. Some fans consider them stories from the imaginations of authors and artists, while other fans consider them as taking place in an alternative fictional reality. However unlike fan fiction, overviews summarising their story, written early in the writing process, were 'approved' by both Fox and Joss Whedon (or his office), and the books were therefore later published as officially Buffy/Angel merchandise.

Characters include: Angel, Cordelia, Wesley, Gunn, Fred, and Lorne.

External links

Reviews
Teen-books.com - Reviews of this book
Shadowcat.name - Review of this book

Angel (1999 TV series) novels
2004 American novels
2004 fantasy novels